A. R. Marimuthu was an Indian politician and former Member of the Legislative Assembly of Tamil Nadu. He was elected to the Tamil Nadu legislative assembly as a Praja Socialist Party candidate from Adirampattinam constituency in  1957 election. He was elected again as a Praja Socialist Party candidate from Pattukottai constituency in  1967 and 1971 elections. He was elected again as an Indian National Congress candidate from Pattukottai constituency in  1977 election.

References 

Tamil Nadu politicians
Praja Socialist Party politicians
Year of birth missing
Year of death missing
Madras MLAs 1957–1962
Tamil Nadu MLAs 1967–1972
Tamil Nadu MLAs 1971–1976
Tamil Nadu MLAs 1977–1980
Indian National Congress politicians from Tamil Nadu